Ceresola or Cerésola is a locality located in the municipality of Sabiñánigo, in Huesca province, Aragon, Spain. As of 2020, it has a population of 5.

Geography 
Ceresola is located 58km north-northeast of Huesca.

References

Populated places in the Province of Huesca